The 2019–20 CSA Steaua București season was the team's 58th season since its founding in 1947.
It was suspended in March because of the COVID-19 pandemic in Romania. 

On 15 July 2020, AMF Bucharest (Municipal Football Association) decided to freeze the season and declared the first ranked team after 18 rounds, Steaua București, the municipal champion and the participant at the Liga IV promotion play-off. AMF Bucharest also declared Steaua as the winner of Cupa României - Bucharest, because the other 3 teams which were qualified for the semi-finals could not ensure the conditions imposed by the Government for playing the games.

Players

First team squad

Pre-season and friendlies

Competitions

Liga IV - Bucharest

Standings

Matches

Liga IV promotion play-off

Region 6 (South) - Group B

Cupa României

Cupa României – Bucharest

References

CSA Steaua București seasons
Steaua